Byzantium! is a BBC Books original novel written by Keith Topping and based on the long-running British science fiction television series Doctor Who. It features the First Doctor, Ian, Barbara, and Vicki.

Synopsis
Byzantium is an ancient Greek city near the Black Sea. Romans, Greeks, Zealots and Pharisee are all part of its mix.

The Doctor, Ian, Barbara and Vicki arrive for general sight-seeing. However, each soon has to face the possibility of being stranded in this place and time, alone and surrounded by political upheaval.

References

2001 British novels
2001 science fiction novels
Past Doctor Adventures
First Doctor novels
Novels by Keith Topping
BBC Books books
Novels set in ancient Greece